Total Pwnage is the debut extended play by video game metal/power metal band Powerglove released in November 2005, and re-released September 2, 2008. The EP contains cover versions of music from various video games.

Track listing

Personnel

 Bassil Silver-Hajo — drums
 Chris Marchiel — guitars
 Alex Berkson — guitars
 Adam Spalding — session bass
 Recorded at Dangling Pineapple Studios
 Engineered by Bassil Silver-Hajo
 Produced by Powerglove
 Art by Dave Rapoza, Design by Powerglove

2005 debut EPs
Powerglove (band) albums